Gary Delaney (born ) is an English professional boxer of the 1990s and 2000s. He won the British Boxing Board of Control (BBBofC) Southern Area light heavyweight title, World Boxing Board (WBB) light heavyweight title, World Boxing Organization (WBO) Inter-Continental light heavyweight title, BBBofC Southern Area cruiserweight title, and Commonwealth light heavyweight title (twice), and was a challenger for the BBBofC British heavyweight title, and Commonwealth heavyweight title  against Julius Francis, World Boxing Organization (WBO) Inter-Continental cruiserweight title against John Keeton, and Jesper Kristiansen, BBBofC British cruiserweight title, and  Commonwealth (British Empire) cruiserweight title against Bruce Scott, and World Boxing Union cruiserweight title against Sebastiaan Rothmann, and Enzo Maccarinelli, his professional fighting weight varied from light heavyweight to heavyweight.

Murder conviction
On 27 July 2006 Garry Delaney was convicted of murder, and was later sentenced to serve a minimum of 11 years in jail, following the death of Paul Price in October 2005 in a bar in which Delaney was working as a bouncer, after an altercation, Delaney punched Price who fell to the ground, Price's head hit the ground, fracturing his skull, but despite surgery he later died.

Genealogical information
Garry Delaney is the older brother of the boxer Mark Delaney.

Professional boxing record

References

External links

Image - Gary Delaney
Bouncer guilty of uppercut murder
Bouncer jailed for punch murder

1970 births
Cruiserweight boxers
English male boxers
English people convicted of murder
Sportspeople convicted of crimes
Light-heavyweight boxers
Living people
People convicted of murder by England and Wales
People from the London Borough of Newham
Boxers from Greater London